Sobasina cutleri is a species of jumping spider.

Name
The species is named for salticid specialist Bruce Cutler of the University of Kansas in Lawrence.

Distribution
Sobasina cutleri is only known from Viti Levu and Ovalau Islands in Fiji.

References

  (1998): Salticidae of the Pacific Islands. III.  Distribution of Seven Genera, with Description of Nineteen New Species and Two New Genera. Journal of Arachnology  26(2): 149-189. PDF

Salticidae
Endemic fauna of Fiji
Spiders of Fiji
Spiders described in 1998